This is a list of academic journals covering applied linguistics in English.

Applied Linguistics
Annual Review of Applied Linguistics
Issues in Applied Linguistics
Assessing Writing
Bilingualism: Language and Cognition
ITL - International Journal of Applied Linguistics
Journal of Child Language
Journal of Second Language Writing
Language Acquisition
Language Learning
Language Teaching
Language Teaching Research
Language Testing
The Modern Language Journal
Reading and Writing
Research Methods in Applied Linguistics
System
TESOL Journal
TESOL Quarterly
Writing Systems Research
Middle East Journal of Applied Linguistics (MEJAL)
Colombian Applied Linguistics Journal (CALJ)
HOW Journal
Profile: issues in teachers' professional development
GIST: Education and Learning Research Journal